Hilbert operator may refer to:

 The epsilon operator in Hilbert's epsilon calculus
 The Hilbert–Schmidt operators on a Hilbert space
 Hilbert–Schmidt integral operators
 Generally, any operator on a Hilbert space